Tango of Death was a Jewish orchestra in the Janowska concentration camp, located on what is now the outskirts of Lviv, Ukraine.

History 

The initiator of the compulsory organization of musician-prisoners in the orchestra was the deputy commandant of the Janowska camp,   who before the war had "played the violin in a jazz band in Katowice." Rokita was one of many sadistic villains at the camp; "Choice sadists and various scum of the Nazi death machine were in the Janowska concentration camp. Many of these people suffered from pathological perversions...The most diverse ways of killing people were used in this camp. Each Nazi tried to outdo his colleagues by discovering his own special killing method."

The 40-person orchestra consisted of the best Lviv musicians, Jewish prisoners of the camp, some of whom were famous within Europe or even world-famous. The violinist, composer, conductor Jacob Mund, who before the war held the position of musical director of city theaters, was appointed the head of the orchestra. Among the orchestra musicians Josef German, violinist Leonid Stricks, and cellist Leon Eber. During "selections and actions," the orchestra performed a tango "Todestango" [Tango of Death]...composed by Yakub Munt (sp?), former director of the Lvov opera. The music was based on an earlier work by Eduardo Bianco."

During torture the orchestra performed a foxtrot, and often played for several hours in a row under the window of the head of the concentration camp.

Shortly before the liberation of Lviv, during the performance of this tango, all orchestra musicians were shot.  According to Ukrainian survivor Bohdan Kokh: "The most terrible day was the last one, when 25,000 Jews were shot...This operation ended with the last orchestra coming to the pit; they were undressed, they laid down their instruments; they went into the pit, but before that they played the 'Tango of Death' for themselves." 

Subsequently, a sonderkommando was formed, which was engaged in concealing the crimes of the nazis.

References

Further reading
 
 
 Tk

External links 
 «Танго смерти»: музыка за колючей проволокой ІІІ Рейха
 Международная выставка "Танго смерти во Львове: 1941 - 1944. Холокост"
 Ігор Малишевський. Вісім тактів забутої музики
 Танго смерти
 Гиблые места. Самые знаменитые тюрьмы Украины

Jewish musical groups
Musical groups established in 1941
Musical groups disestablished in 1944
The Holocaust in Ukraine